KKLZ (96.3 FM) is a commercial radio station located in Las Vegas, Nevada. The station is owned by Beasley Broadcast Group and airs a classic hits music format branded as "96-3 KKLZ". The KKLZ studios are located in Spring Valley, an unincorporated area of Clark County, while its transmitter is on Black Mountain in Henderson.

History

Top 40
The station first signed on January 26, 1984 as KITT with a top 40 music format.

Classic rock
On January 1, 1986, KITT flipped from CHR to an adult contemporary music format branded "Z96", with new call letters KKLZ to accompany the change. By mid-1986, the station was airing a classic rock format and began identifying on-air as "The All New 96.3 KKLZ".

Morning drive personalities from this era included original morning show hosts The O Brothers, followed by Butz and Tucker, then Johnson and Tofte in early 1990. Other disc jockeys included Danny Lea, Jeffrey "Professor Jeff" Anderson, Dennis Mitchell, The Warrior, Kimberly Kelly, with Backseat Beth, and Bruno and The Big Kahuna. KKLZ produced much of its programming locally, such as The Poorman's Concert, The Night Of The Living Dead, and Cruisin' for a Bluesin'''. Also on KKLZ was one of the original Breakfast with the Beatles programs, which today is still hosted by Dennis as a nationally syndicated program originating from KTYD in Santa Barbara, California.

From 1993 to 2002, KKLZ presented an annual concert festival known as "June Fest". It was held the first Saturday of every June on soccer fields just outside Sam Boyd Stadium and featured a long roster of rock artists. Throughout the year, listeners presented suggestions for concert lineups and requests for information about the show as it approached. Attendance ranged between 20,000 and 40,000.

KKLZ reached its creative zenith, as a classic rock station, in the mid-to-late 1990s when its studios were located on Industrial Road in Las Vegas. The trailblazing and innovative morning show during this time, Johnson & Tofte, enjoyed unprecedented local popularity in Las Vegas until they were fired due to the dissatisfaction of station management with program content. Since the passage of the Telecommunications Act of 1996, KKLZ has changed ownership multiple times. Starting in 2003, however, the station's Arbitron ratings improved and KKLZ became the top rock music station in Las Vegas among males ages 25–54 during the Spring 2005 ratings period.

Classic hits
Despite the station's success with the classic rock format, owner Beasley Broadcast Group decided to take the station in a different musical direction. On May 24, 2007, KKLZ changed its format to classic hits. In March 2010, KKLZ held the #1 position in the Las Vegas market among adults 25–54. In April, KKLZ became the #1 rated station overall among persons ages 6+ and persons 12+.

As of April 2019, KKLZ on-air personalities include morning show hosts Mike O'Brian and Carla Rea (Mike & Carla in the Morning''), Wendy Rush middays, Larry Martino in afternoon drive, and Morty evenings. The station's general manager is Tom Humm.

Awards and nominations
Since 2010, KKLZ has earned three Marconi Radio Award nominations, but has not won any such awards.

References

External links

KLZ
Classic hits radio stations in the United States
Radio stations established in 1984
KLZ